In enzymology, an ethanolamine oxidase is an enzyme that catalyzes the chemical reaction

ethanolamine + H2O + O2  glycolaldehyde + NH3 + H2O2

The 3 substrates of this enzyme are ethanolamine, H2O, and O2, whereas its 3 products are glycolaldehyde, NH3, and H2O2.

This enzyme belongs to the family of oxidoreductases, specifically those acting on the CH-NH2 group of donors with oxygen as acceptor.  The systematic name of this enzyme class is ethanolamine:oxygen oxidoreductase (deaminating). It has 2 cofactors: cobalt,  and Cobamide.

References

 

EC 1.4.3
Cobalt enzymes
Cobamide enzymes
Enzymes of unknown structure